Waterfoot is a village in East Renfrewshire, Scotland. The village shares a community council with the neighbouring community of Eaglesham, the Eaglesham and Waterfoot Community Council meets in Eaglesham on a monthly basis.

During the Second World War, deputy leader of the Nazi party Rudolf Hess, crash landed in Floors Farm, west of the village. He was arrested and held in custody until after the war, when he was tried at the Nuremberg trials.

The audio equipment manufacturer Linn Products has its factory to the southwest of Waterfoot.

Development
The Glasgow Southern Orbital road (part of the A726) passes just to the south of Waterfoot.
The village lies on the west bank of the White Cart Water, and the original settlement grew up around a farm, mill and smithy. One early record of the village is in Timothy Pont's maps of Scotland (1583–1596).

Waterfoot today is purely residential in character, having expanded as a commuter dormitory village, primarily in the latter half of the 20th century. The 2011 census reported that Waterfoot had a population of 1,280. There was some controversy in 2012 when East Renfrewshire Council wanted to sell Waterfoot Park to the housebuilder CALA Homes so that they could build 29 homes. A new park, Inky Pink Park, was created using funds provided by CALA to mitigate for the loss of Waterfoot Park when it was built on.

Notable people
Winifred Drinkwater, the world's first female commercial airline pilot, was born in Waterfoot on 11 April 1913.

Gallery

References

External links

 Waterfoot at Gazetteer for Scotland
Busby & Waterfoot - Illustrated Guide 

Villages in East Renfrewshire
Populated places established in the 16th century